Joseph Ryan Whitney (born February 6, 1988) is an American former professional ice hockey forward. He most notably played with the New Jersey Devils of the National Hockey League (NHL).

Playing career
As a youth, Whitney played in the 2002 Quebec International Pee-Wee Hockey Tournament with the Boston Junior Eagles minor ice hockey team.

After completing his collegiate career with the Boston College Eagles, Whitney signed a professional try-out contract with the Portland Pirates of the American Hockey League to end the 2010–11 season.

On August 22, 2011, the Albany Devils signed Whitney as a free agent to an AHL contract.

After two seasons with Albany, Whitney was rewarded with a NHL contract with Albany's parent affiliate, the New Jersey Devils. He signed a two-year entry level deal on May 2, 2013.

During the 2013–14 season, on January 24, 2014 Whitney was called up to the New Jersey Devils to make his NHL debut against the Washington Capitals at the Prudential Center.

On July 1, 2015, Whitney signed as a free agent with the New York Islanders on a one-year two-way contract.

At the conclusion of the season, Whitney left the Islanders organization as a free agent. On July 1, 2016, he signed a one-year, two-way contract to join the Colorado Avalanche. After attending the Avalanche's 2016 training camp, Whitney was reassigned during the pre-season to AHL affiliate, the San Antonio Rampage. As a veteran of the American League, Whitney was selected as the Rampage captain to begin the 2016–17 campaign. After a slow transition adjusting offensively, Whitney resumed his scoring proficiency in collecting 11 goals and 28 points in 55 games before he was traded at the NHL deadline by the Avalanche to the Arizona Coyotes in exchange for Brendan Ranford on March 1, 2017.

As a free agent from the Coyotes in the off-season, Whitney agreed to sign a one-year AHL contract with the Hartford Wolf Pack on September 7, 2017. In the 2017-18 season, Whitney was selected as team captain for a second successive season in the AHL. In 40 games with the Wolf Pack, Whitney collected 19 points before on February 9, 2018, the Wolf Pack's parent club, the New York Rangers, traded Whitney to the Washington Capitals' AHL affiliate in the Hershey Bears.

After completing his eighth professional season in the AHL and North America, Whitney opted to embark on a European career, agreeing to a two-year contract with Swedish club, Linköping HC  of the SHL, on July 10, 2018.

After two seasons with Linköping, Whitney opted to continue his career in the DEL, signing a contract with the Iserlohn Roosters on November 27, 2020. Whitney reached the playoffs in his first season in Iserlohn. With 21 goals and 24 assists, Withney became top scorer of the main round of the 2020–21 season.

In completing his second season with Iserlohn, his 11th professional season, Whitney ended his contract early in order to announce his retirement from professional hockey on July 15, 2022.

Career statistics

Awards and honors

References

External links

1988 births
Living people
Albany Devils players
Boston College Eagles men's ice hockey players
Bridgeport Sound Tigers players
Hartford Wolf Pack players
Hershey Bears players
Ice hockey players from Massachusetts
Iserlohn Roosters players
Linköping HC players
New Jersey Devils players
People from Reading, Massachusetts
Portland Pirates players
San Antonio Rampage players
Sportspeople from Middlesex County, Massachusetts
Tucson Roadrunners players
Undrafted National Hockey League players
American men's ice hockey left wingers